is a Japanese adult visual novel developed by Front Wing which was released on December 26, 2008 playable for Windows as a DVD.

Hoshiuta is Front Wing's twenty-first title and the third title of Uta series along with their previous titles Yukiuta and Sorauta.

A manga adaptation illustrated by Fumio began serialization in the May 2009 issue of Kadokawa Shoten's Comp Ace magazine.

A spin-off sequel to the visual novel entitled Hoshiuta: Starlight Serenade was released on December 25, 2009.

Setting
Hoshiuta is set in the fictional town  in Shizuoka Prefecture, Japan. The town is in a quiet, rural area on the west of the Izu Peninsula and borders the Suruga Bay. There is a high school named  in the town. The protagonist Kazuhiko Suoh and his friends are students of the school.

Characters

Main characters

Kazuhiko is a second-year male student of Mihoshi Academy and is the protagonist of the story. He was left an orphan in his childhood, and was adopted by an old woman named Hina Suoh.

Voiced by:Ayaka Kimura
Yui is a second-year female student. She is Kazuhiko's childhood friend and his classmate. She and her parents moved from Tokyo to Mihoshi nine years ago. She has a positive personality, but she is not good at studying and cooking. Her parents run a Japanese-style hotel named Kuroda Ryokan. Kazuhiko and Yui work together at Kuroda Ryokan.

Voiced by:Tomoe Tamiyasu
Nanano is Kazuhiko's younger sister-in-law and a first-year student. She is Hina Suoh's granddaughter. Her parents died in her childhood the same as Kazuhiko's parents. She has  an innocent personality and loves Kazuhiko very much.

Voiced by: Kaname Yuzuki
Kurara is a second-year female student. Her father  is the president of Amamiya Zaibatsu which is one of the largest companies in Japan, but she does not boast of that. She moved from Tokyo to Mihoshi before the summer vacation begins, and became a classmate of Kazuhiko and Yui. She is good at cooking and painting pictures.

Voiced by: Yukari Aoyama
Midori is a third-year female student and good friend of Kazuhiko, Yui, and Nanano. She has used a wheelchair since four years ago when she lost the use of her left leg in a traffic accident. She and her friends call her wheelchair . She is very spirited and good at swimming.

Voiced by: Karen Aozora
Renge is a mysterious girl living in a Western-style house built nearby the sea. Kazuhiko met her in his way to the school on a morning. She likes playing tricks and often fibs. Unlike other main characters, she is not Mihoshi Academy's student.

Supporting characters

Voiced by: Mikado Sumeragi
Yousuke is a second-year male student and a classmate of Kazuhiko. Kazuhiko and Yousuke became friends after they had entered Mihoshi Academy. He is not good at studying.

Voiced by:Rina Misaki
Arisa is a second-year female student and a classmate of Kazuhiko. She moved from Tokyo to Mihoshi last year. Her father  manages a large company named Houjou Group, and she is proud of that. She is smart and good at studying.

Voiced by:Hazuki Sakura
Koume is a maid working under Amamiya family. She has looked after Kurara since about ten years ago.

Voiced by:Kū Iida
Kayo is Yui's mother and the landlady of Kuroda Ryokan.

Voiced by:Eiko Matsu
Hina is Nanano's grandmother and Kazuhiko's grandmother-in-law. She took charge of Kazuhiko and Nanano and brought them up, but she died at age seventy-two last year. She worked at Kuroda Ryokan as a waitress during her lifetime.

Voiced by:Ayumu Kawase
Seiko is a young female teacher working at Mihoshi Academy. She is in charge of Japanese history lessons and is the homeroom teacher of Kazuhiko's class.

Voiced by:Kanade Amano
Kamejirou is a turtle which Kazuhiko and Nanano have as their pet. Kame means "turtle" in Japanese, and Jirou is one of Japanese male names. Nanano likes Kamejirou very much.

Voiced by:Izumi Maki
Yurika is Kurara's mother and Masaki Amamiya's former wife. She died of an illness about ten years ago. She was very kind to Kurara.

Voiced by:Kanai Nirai
Tamaki is Kurara's stepmother and Masaki Amamiya's present wife. She used to be an able secretary to Masaki. She married Masaki after Yurika had died. She is not kind to Kurara.

Voiced by:Ajisai
Teppei is Midori's father and a fisherman. He dotes upon his daughter. His wife died of an illness when Midori was a child.

Voiced by:Mirin Yamada
Mutou is a housekeeper living with Renge. She is very kind and thinks as if Renge were her daughter.

Voiced by:Jimudaisya
Kashimura is Renge's father. He divorced Renge's mother when Renge was a child.

Development
Direction and planning for Hoshiuta and Hoshiuta: Starlight Serenade was done by Ryūichirō Yamakawa. Characters were designed by Fumio. Scenario was written by Noboru Yamaguchi, Takeyuki Kuzumi, and Katsuya. Music in the game was composed by Elements Garden.

Music and audio CDs
Before the game's release, a maxi-single "Hoshikuzu no Kizuna" was released by Front Wing on October 2, 2009 and contained "Stardust Bonds" and "Twilight Sky".

Music of the five songs was composed by Hitoshi Fujima, who is a member of Elements Garden.

Hoshiuta'''s original soundtrack was released by Front Wing on January 30, 2009 and contained twenty-seven tracks.

MangaHoshiuta was adapted into a manga series drawn by Japanese illustrator Fumio. The manga began its serialization in the manga magazine Comp Aces May 2009 issue, first published on March 26, 2009 by Kadokawa Shoten.

Book
An art book entitled Fumio ArtWorks Hoshiuta was released on Comiket 76 held in August 2009.

References

External links
Hoshiuta official web site 
Hoshiuta: Starlight Serenade official web site 
Bishoujo Game "Hoshiuta": Guarantee! All Heroines are "Brand New" 

2008 video games
Bishōjo games
Eroge
Frontwing games
Harem anime and manga
Harem video games
Japan-exclusive video games
Kadokawa Shoten manga
Manga based on video games
2009 manga
Romance anime and manga
Romance video games
School life in anime and manga
Seinen manga
Video games developed in Japan
Visual novels
Windows games
Windows-only games